Solomon Zalman ben Judah Loeb ha-Kohen Hanau (later known by the acronym Raza"h or Zalman Hanau or Zalman Henna (1687–1746), was a German Jewish expert in Hebrew grammar and critical textual critic of Jewish liturgy and prayer nussach.<ref>Magne Sæbø Hebrew Bible, Old Testament: The History of its Interpretation, II: From the Renaissance to the Englightenment (9783525539828) 2008 p1009 "Solomon Hanau (1687–1746), a native of Frankfurt am Main who also lived for a time in Amsterdam and other Western European cities, joined other scholars in complaining bitterly about the neglect of Hebrew and its detrimental effect on ..."</ref>

Birthplace
Shlomo (Zalman) ben Yehuda Leib Katz was born in Hanau (also known as Henna''), Germany and lived in part in Frankfurt, Hamburg, Amsterdam, Berlin and Hanover. At the age of 21 he composed his first dikduk work, "Binyan Shlomo". He was fiercely criticized by Jacob Emden, though Emden's father, Tzvi Ashkenazi, authored an approval letter to Hanau for his textual work. Recent study suggests that Shneur Zalman of Liadi followed many of Solomon's variations when composing his Chabad Nusach of Jewish prayer (Nusach Ari).

Family 
He had a son Simson b. Salomo who worked as a printer in Homburg vor der Höhe until 1730. He printed an edition of the Ma'assebuch in 1727.

Hebrew works 
Binyan Shlomo (Frankfurt)
Hateivah
Sha'arei Tefillah, (The gates of prayer) (Isnitz)
Baith Tfilah
Nikkud basics (Amsterdam)
Exchange Torah (Hamburg)

Footnotes 

1687 births
1746 deaths
People from Hanau
Grammarians of Hebrew
Kohanim writers of Rabbinic literature
17th-century German Jews